The Squeaker is a 1937 British crime film directed by William K. Howard and starring Edmund Lowe, Sebastian Shaw and Ann Todd. Edmund Lowe reprised his stage performance in the role of Inspector Barrabal. It is based on the 1927 novel The Squeaker and 1928 play of the same name by Edgar Wallace. Wallace's son Bryan Edgar Wallace worked on the film's screenplay. The Squeaker is underworld slang for an informer. The film is sometimes known by its U.S. alternative title Murder on Diamond Row.

Plot
London's thieves are at the mercy of a super fence, who is in on every big jewellery robbery in the city. If the thieves won't split the loot with him, 'The Squeaker' shops them to the Police. A disgraced ex-detective believes there may be an opportunity to clear his name if he can capture 'The Squeaker'.

Cast
 Edmund Lowe as Inspector Barrabal
 Sebastian Shaw as Frank Sutton
 Ann Todd as Carol Stedman
 Tamara Desni as Tamara
 Robert Newton as Larry Graeme
 Allan Jeayes as Inspector Elford
 Alastair Sim as Joshua Collie
 Stewart Rome as Police Superintendent Marshall
 Mabel Terry-Lewis as Mrs. Stedman
 Gordon McLeod as Mr. Field
 Alf Goddard as Sergeant Hawkins
 Danny Green as Safecracker
 Michael Rennie as Medical Examiner

Critical reception
TV Guide wrote, "(it) has its moments, but is bogged down by the unnecessary characterizations, some occasionally inept lensing, and slow-paced direction"; while the Radio Times wrote, "Edgar Wallace's classic whodunnit has been reworked into an efficient crime story by producer Alexander Korda...Confined within starchy studio sets, William K Howard directs steadily, but the removal of that touch of mystery leaves him with precious little to play with, to the extent that he has to bolster the action with protracted love scenes between Lowe and Ann Todd. Robert Newton and Alastair Sim put in pleasing support appearances"; and Leonard Maltin wrote, "classy cast in first-rate Edgar Wallace mystery."

See also
 The Squeaker (1930)
 The Squeaker (1931)
 The Squeaker (1963)

References

External links

1937 films
1937 crime films
Films directed by William K. Howard
Films based on works by Edgar Wallace
Films set in London
British crime films
British black-and-white films
1930s English-language films
1930s British films